José Tanig Joya (June 3, 1931 – May 11, 1995) was a Filipino abstract artist and a National Artist of the Philippines awardee. 
Joya was a printmaker, painter, mixed media artist, and a former dean of the University of the Philippines' College of Fine Arts. He pioneered abstract expressionism in the Philippines. His canvases were characterized by "dynamic spontaneity" and "quick gestures" of action painting. He is the creator of compositions that were described as "vigorous compositions" of heavy impastoes, bold brushstrokes, controlled dips, and diagonal swipes". Joya added the brilliant tropical colors. He was awarded a grant which enabled him to pursue a master's degree in Fine Arts in 1956–57.  
His works were strongly influenced by the tropical landscapes of the Philippine Islands. Among his masterpieces are the jedree
(a collage rendered with Asian calligraphy and forms and patterns resembling rice paddies), the Granadean Arabesque (1958) and Biennial (1964)

Death
Jose died in 1995 of blood loss in Rizal Avenue, Manila, Philippines

See also
Art Collection at the Philippine Center, New York City

References

External links
Samito.net

Filipino artists
National Artists of the Philippines
1931 births
1995 deaths
Filipino printmakers
University of the Philippines alumni
20th-century Filipino painters
Burials at the Libingan ng mga Bayani
20th-century printmakers